The Australia Hotel was a hotel on Castlereagh Street, Sydney in New South Wales, Australia. From its opening in 1891 until its closure on 30 June 1971 and subsequent demolition, the hotel was considered "the best-known hotel in Australia", "the premier hotel in Sydney" and described itself as "The Hotel of the Commonwealth". The hotel was situated in one of Sydney's important thoroughfares in the Sydney central business district.

Opening
The foundation stone was laid by Sir Henry Parkes in 1889, and the opening of the new establishment was performed two years later by Sarah Bernhardt, whose name was first in the new hotel's register, subsequently displayed in a glass showcase in the main foyer. The Sydney Morning Herald reported "French actress Sarah Bernhardt arrived in Sydney, bringing with her 100 pieces of luggage. As hundreds of fans flooded onto Redfern railway platform as her train approached, she was whisked away from the platform to the Australia Hotel where hundreds more excited fans wanted to catch a glimpse of the glamorous celebrity. Her expensive flower filled 2nd floor suite played host to pets including a large St Bernard, a smaller pug dog, a native bear and several cages containing possums and parrots. Theatergoers, many of whom had paid up to £2 for a seat, were genuinely moved by Mme Bernhardt's performance in Dumas' La Dame aux Camillias at Her Majesty's Theatre. After the show, drama critics called her a 'woman of genius' saying she had held the audience spell bound." Next to the hotel, across Rowe Street, stood the famous Theatre Royal.

Architecture

The hotel had a large main entrance on Castlereagh Street in polished granite, the stairs grey and white marble, the doric columns red. The squared columns in the entrance foyer were imported Italian marble, and the magnificent neo-classical staircase which led from the main foyer to the first floor was completely in multi-coloured Carrara marble. From that floor to the 10th a massive carved and highly polished mahogany Victorian grand staircase, with stained glass windows, led to their rooms those guests, who, in the early days of lifts, still preferred to walk.

In the late 1920s an extension was constructed to the north of the main hotel which fronted onto Martin Place. A highlight of this block was its circular art deco black glass staircase.

A small branch of department store David Jones was located in the hotel, which provided goods for visitors, hampers for sending to Great Britain and Australiana souvenirs.

The hotel also contained a number of very fine paintings of Australian scenes including eight watercolours by Gladstone Eyre.

Standards
The hotel boasted international standards of comfort and service. The Australia became "the place to stay and be seen by the upper echelons of society". The hotel remained an oasis for those who scorned modernity and sought the more refined atmosphere of the classic European hotels. Apart from the accommodation for guests, rooms were also provided in the Rowe Street wing for their servants, including the children's nurses, who had their own dining room with their charges. Robert Helpmann had a suite permanently reserved; Marlene Dietrich stayed there several times (thereafter her suite, rooms 707–708, was named after her) and one lady lived there for 31 years.

Notable events

The hotel hosted many famous events.

 On Monday, 28 January 1901, the hotel saw the literary Bohemian society of Sydney gather for the send-off of Scottish-Australian poet and bush balladeer Will H. Ogilvie (1869–1963). Those present included painter Julian Ashton, writer Barbara Baynton, poet Christopher Brennan, poet Victor Daley, writer Albert Dorrington, playwright Alice Eyton, sculptor Nelson Illingworth, artist Fred Leist, poet Louise Mack (Mrs Creed), singer Eva Mylott, poet Banjo Paterson, poet and member of parliament Patrick Quinn, his brother and poet Roderic Quinn, artist Tom Roberts, activist Rose Scott, artist D. H. Souter, journalist and suffragist Agnes Storrie, and writer and critic A. G. Stephens.
 The hotel was the venue for the first meeting for the establishment of the Wireless Institute of Australia in March 1910.
 Later in 1910 AWA obtained a licence from the Postmaster-General's Department to run telegraphy tests, from the hotel's 6th floor, with ships at sea, on 27 August. It was subsequently permitted to handle commercial traffic in 1911 – the first in Australia.
 5 December 1915 a fire broke out at 11.30 am in the north-east corner of the roof and quickly spread, eventually gutting the upper three floors, but without loss of life.
 In April 1919 the famous entertainer Sir Harry Lauder was staying at The Australia and giving a luncheon party when he was formally notified that he was to be knighted upon his return to Britain.
 In January 1941 Cabinet Ministers gave a dinner at The Australia for Robert Menzies who was about to leave for Great Britain.
 In April 1949 the hotel had the historic importance of being the venue of the first successful television demonstration in Australia, when the State Governor, Lieutenant-General John Northcott was televised in the hotel's ballroom as he opened the demonstration.

Closure, demolition, heritage
In 1968 the Hotel Australia was purchased by MLC who, amid mounting concerns, announced their intention of refurbishing and maintaining the hotel, one of the city's landmarks. However the following year they announced its impending closure and closed it on 30 June 1971. They demolished it in almost record time, to erect a modern $200 million, 68-storey office block/skyscraper in its place; the MLC Centre.

The Royal Australian Historical Society who fix their famous Green Plaques to historic buildings and sites, placed their 39th plaque on the MLC Centre in memory of the Australia Hotel.

See also

References

Further reading
 Sydney Harbour Bridge Official Souvenir & Programme, NSW Government Printer, 1932, p. 128.
 Ruhen, Carl, Pub Splendid - The Australia Hotel 1891-1971, John Burrell (Murray Child Ltd., pubs.), Collaroy N.S.W., 1995,

External links
 https://web.archive.org/web/20070702084549/http://www.rahs.org.au/GREEN%20PLAQUESdraft.pdf
 Hotel Australia entry at the Dictionary of Sydney
 Hotel in Grafton, Australia

Defunct hotels in Sydney
Hotel buildings completed in 1890
Demolished buildings and structures in Sydney
Demolished hotels in Australia
1890 establishments in Australia
1972 disestablishments in Australia
Castlereagh Street, Sydney
George Allen Mansfield buildings
Buildings and structures demolished in 1972